Thomas Byrne Edsall (born August 22, 1941) is an American journalist and academic. He is best known for his weekly opinion column for The New York Times, for his 25 years covering national politics for the Washington Post and for his eight years at the Columbia University Graduate School of Journalism where he was the holder of the Joseph Pulitzer II and Edith Pulitzer Moore Chair.

Early life and family
Edsall was born in Cambridge, Massachusetts, the son of Richard Linn Edsall and Katherine Byrne. and the grandson of David Linn Edsall. He attended Brown University before receiving his B.A. from Boston University in 1966.

He is married and lives in New York and Washington, D.C., with his wife, Mary (daughter of Karl Deutsch), with whom he co-authored the book Chain Reaction.

Career
Edsall served as a VISTA volunteer from 1966 to 1967 and he wrote for The Providence Journal in 1965. Edsall covered politics for The Baltimore Sun from 1967 to 1981; and he covered national politics for the Washington Post from 1981 to 2006. He was the political editor of the Huffington Post from 2007 to 2009, a correspondent for The New Republic from 2006 to 2013 and for the National Journal from 2006 to 2007.

In November and December 2006, Edsall was a guest columnist for the print edition of the New York Times Op-Ed page.

From 2006 to 2014, Edsall served as the Joseph Pulitzer II and Edith Pulitzer Moore Professor of Public Affairs Journalism at the Columbia University Graduate School of Journalism, where he continues to teach in an adjunct capacity.

In 2011, he became a weekly opinion columnist for the New York Times.

Awards and fellowships
 Shapiro Fellowship, School of Media and Public Affairs, George Washington University (2015)
 Markwell Award of the International Society of Political Psychology (2014)
 Finalist, General Non-Fiction, Pulitzer Prize, 1992, for Chain Reaction: The Impact on American Politics of Race, Rights and Taxes (W.W. Norton)
 Bill Pryor Memorial Award, Washington-Baltimore Newspaper Guild, 1981
 Carey McWilliams Award, American Political Science Association, 1994
 Fellowship at the Woodrow Wilson International Center for Scholars 1996–1997
 Media Fellow at the Hoover Institution, Stanford University, 1997, 2000, 2003–2006, 2010–2012

Works

References

External links

 New York Times columns
 
 A War of All Against All; Are Democrats and Republicans now engaged in a 'death struggle' over dwindling resources, making gridlock and dysfunction more likely? by W. James Antle III January 10, 2012, a The Age of Austerity WSJ book review
 "What Became of the Democrats" by David Oshinsky
 "Race" by Thomas Byrne Edsall
 "The Wind that Blew in Reagan" by Murray Kempton
 The Political Price of Austerity by Mark Schmitt January 20, 2012 NYT book review
 Collected columns from The New Republic

1941 births
Living people
American male journalists
Columbia University Graduate School of Journalism faculty
Writers from Cambridge, Massachusetts
Journalists from Washington, D.C.
HuffPost writers and columnists
Journalists from Massachusetts
20th-century American journalists
20th-century American male writers
21st-century American journalists
21st-century American male writers